Section 36 of the Constitution Act, 1867 is a provision of the Constitution of Canada relating to the voting procedure in the Senate of Canada.

The Constitution Act, 1867 is the constitutional statute which established Canada.  Originally named the British North America Act, 1867, the Act continues to be the foundational statute for the Constitution of Canada, although it has been amended many times since 1867.  It is now recognised as part of the supreme law of Canada.

Constitution Act, 1867

The Constitution Act, 1867 is part of the Constitution of Canada and thus part of the supreme law of Canada.  It was the product of extensive negotiations by the governments of the British North American provinces in the 1860s. The Act sets out the constitutional framework of Canada, including the structure of the  federal government and the powers of the federal government and the provinces.  Originally enacted in 1867 by the British Parliament under the name the British North America Act, 1867, in 1982 the Act was brought under full Canadian control through the Patriation of the Constitution, and was renamed the Constitution Act, 1867.  Since Patriation the Act can only be amended in Canada, under the amending formula set out in the Constitution Act, 1982.

Text of section 36 

Section 36 reads:
{{Bquote|Voting in Senate36 Questions arising in the Senate shall be decided by a Majority of Voices, and the Speaker shall in all Cases have a Vote, and when the Voices are equal the Decision shall be deemed to be in the Negative.}}

Section 36 is found in Part IV of the Constitution Act, 1867, dealing with the federal legislative power.  It has not been amended since the Act was enacted in 1867.

Purpose and interpretation
This section provides the Speaker of the Senate with a "deliberative vote".  The Speaker, like any other member of the Senate, can vote on any matter before the Senate.  In the event of a tied vote, the matter is defeated.  The Speaker does not have a "casting vote" to resolve a tie.

This provision is modelled on the voting practice in the British House of Lords, where the Lord Chancellor had the right to vote on any matter, with a tie resulting in the defeat of the matter.  This practice continues after the reforms to the House of Lords, with the Lord Speaker having a deliberative vote.UK Parliament — Divisions — Tied Votes.

Tied votes are rare in the Senate, but they do occur.  One notable example occurred in 1991, with Bill C-43 of 1990, relating to abortion. In 1988, the Supreme Court of Canada had held in R v Morgentaler'' that the abortion provisions of the Criminal Code were unconstitutional.  Bill C-43, introduced by the Progressive Conservative government of Brian Mulroney, would have recriminalised abortions in certain cases.  The bill passed the House of Commons on May 29, 1990 on a free vote (140 to 130), but was defeated in the Senate on January 31, 1991 on a tie vote (43 to 43).  Speaker Guy Charbonneau did not vote on the bill.

The deliberative vote of the Speaker of the Senate is different from the casting vote of the Speaker of the House of Commons, who only votes in the case of a tie.

Related provisions
Section 49 of the Act provides that the Speaker of the House of Commons only votes in the case of a tie.

References 

Constitution of Canada
Canadian Confederation
Federalism in Canada